Amityville: The Final Chapter is the third installment of the Amityville book series written by John G. Jones. Most of the book is believed to be fiction unrelated to the actual claims of the Lutz family. Amityville: The Final Chapter was intended to be the final book in the series. However after the success of this book an entirely fictional Amityville sequel was created titled Amityville: The Evil Escapes.

Plot

As the Lutz family flies around the world on a publicity tour they are horrified to discover the Entity continues to haunt them wherever they go.

References

1985 American novels
1980s horror novels
American horror novels
The Amityville Horror